Appling County High School (formerly known as Appling County Comprehensive High School) is a high school in Baxley, Appling County, Georgia, United States. It is part of the Appling County School District.

It has approximately 1,000 students and 70 teachers in grades 9-12. The students are 66% white, 30% African-American, and 4% Hispanic.  62% of the school's students are eligible for free lunch, above the state average of 50%.

Academics
The average ACT score at Appling County was 18, lower than the Georgia state average of 20 and the national average of 21.

Notable alumni

 Byron Buxton ('12), MLB outfielder for the Minnesota Twins
 Dexter Carter, former professional football player
 Frankie King, NBA guard for Los Angeles Lakers (1995); born in Baxley
 Jamie Nails, NFL guard for Buffalo Bills (1997-2000) and Miami Dolphins (2002-2003); born in Baxley
 Carl Simpson, defensive tackle for Chicago Bears (1993-1997), Arizona Cardinals (1998-1999), and Las Vegas Outlaws (2001)
 Harry Skipper, defensive back in the CFL for seven years; played for the Montreal Concordes and Saskatchewan Roughriders 1983–1989

References

External links
 

Schools in Appling County, Georgia
Public high schools in Georgia (U.S. state)